= Zhongshan Sports Centre Stadium =

Sports venue in Zhongshan, Guangdong, China

- Location: Zhongshan, China
- Capacity: 12,000
- Surface: Grass

The Zhongshan Sports Centre Stadium is a multi-purpose stadium in Zhongshan, China.

== Background ==
It is located in the Guangdong province and it is currently used mostly for football matches. The venue is also used for athletics and other events. It has a capacity of 12,000. It became the largest sports venue by capacity in the city of Zhongshan. Two stands are covered with a roof.
